Andreas Bovenschulte (born 11 August 1965) is a German lawyer and politician of the Social Democratic Party (SPD) who has been serving as the President of the Senate and Mayor of Bremen since 2019.

Early life and education
Bovenschulte was born 1965 in Hildesheim and studied jurisprudence at the University of Bremen.

Political career
In the late 1980s, Bovenschulte served as the University of Bremen’s student council president.

From 2010 to 2013 Bovenschulte was chairman of the SPD in Bremen and since August 2019 he is ruling mayor of Bremen.

As one of the state's representatives at the Bundesrat, Bovenschulte serves on the Committee on Foreign Affairs and on the Committee on Defence. On behalf of the SPD, he coordinated the Bundesrat’s selection of new judges for the Federal Constitutional Court in 2020.

Other activities
 Business Forum of the Social Democratic Party of Germany, Member of the Political Advisory Board (since 2020)
 Cultural Foundation of the German States (KdL), Ex-Officio Member of the Council (since 2019)
 spw – Zeitschrift für sozialistische Politik und Wirtschaft, Member of the Editorial Board
 Wilhelm and Helene Kaisen Foundation, Member of the Board of Trustees (since 2019)

References

Mayors of Bremen
1965 births
Living people
People from Hildesheim
Social Democratic Party of Germany politicians